The taraban is a percussive drum-like folk instrument of Turkish origin, which was once used in Ukraine and, to a lesser extent, in Poland. 

The etymology of the term comes from a word meaning to make a lot of noise. The first mentions of the taraban date back to the 11th century. It was most likely introduced in East-Central Europe by the Ottoman Janissaries.

The taraban is struck with the hand or a stick. In comparison to the bubon, the taraban usually has two sides with a stretched skin and no cymbals. 

It was a popular instrument among the Ukrainian Cossacks and is considered a Ukrainian folk instrument. Taraban is also mentioned in the Polish anthem and was once utilised by some army units of the Polish–Lithuanian Commonwealth.

Related instruments
 Resheto 
 Bubon
 Lytavry

See also
Ukrainian folk music

References

Sources
Humeniuk, A. Ukrainski narodni muzychni instrumenty, Kyiv: Naukova dumka, 1967 
Mizynec, V. Ukrainian Folk Instruments, Melbourne: Bayda books, 1984 
Cherkaskyi, L. Ukrainski narodni muzychni instrumenty, Tekhnika, Kyiv, Ukraine, 2003 - 262 pages.  

Ukrainian musical instruments
Turkish musical instruments
European percussion instruments
Membranophones